Secaucus is the second album by the American rock band The Wrens, released in 1996. Secaucus is named for the city in which it was recorded, Secaucus, New Jersey. The Wrens were signed to major label Grass Records for the album; Grass dropped the band after they refused to be forced into a new contract. The Wrens' follow-up to  Secaucus, The Meadowlands, was released seven years later, in 2003.

Critical reception
Spin deemed Secaucus a "Pixies-lovin’ garage-pop grab-bag." Trouser Press wrote: "The album displays the Wrens’ newly impressive range, from the racing shamble of the opening 'Yellow Number Three' and the glammy, vamping 'Built in Girls' to 'I’ll Mind You', which is an ambient, spacey instrumental." Robert Christgau, in The Village Voice, wrote that "the sonic turf is far broader than most indie bands ever dare, and there's a relationship sequence in the middle that lays on the hurt--'I've Made Enough Friends', killer." The Philadelphia Inquirer wrote that the album "combines artful '60s pop and razor-sharp, late-'70s new wave."

Track listing

References

External links
 Lyrics at the Wrens Official Site

1996 albums
The Wrens albums
Secaucus, New Jersey